Hit 'n Strum is a 2012 Canadian drama film directed by Kirk Caouette, starring Michelle Harrison and Kirk Caouette.

Cast
 Michelle Harrison as Stephanie
 Kirk Caouette as Mike
 Paul McGillion as Christopher
 Marion Eisman as Stephanie's Mother
 Sean Allan as Stephanie's Father
 John Mann as Guitar Store Clerk

Release
The film opened in theatres on 8 March 2013.

Reception
Chris Knight of the National Post rated the film 2.5 stars out of 4, writing that "The plot may not quite measure up to the music, but taken together, they make a nice duet." Ken Eisner of The Georgia Straight called the film "goodhearted" and "beautifully shot".

Linda Barnard of the Toronto Star rated the film 2 stars out of 4 and wrote that "while the music is good and the scenery, thanks to cinematographer Pieter Stathis’s very capable camerawork, is gorgeous, the story often subs ploys for sympathy in place of inspiration." Liam Lacey of The Globe and Mail called the film a "technically competent but clumsily scripted drama about a legal princess and a musical pauper that loses momentum right after the initial collision."

References

External links
 
 

2013 films
Canadian drama films
2013 drama films
2010s Canadian films